The Elora Rocks are a senior hockey team based out of Elora, Ontario, Canada.  They play in the WOSHL, the Western Ontario Super Hockey League presented by Sleeman Breweries.

History

In the early 1990s, the Elora Rocks were members of the Northern Senior A Hockey League, winning their final two league titles before jumping to the WOAA in 1993.

Elora has captured the WOAA Sr. "AA" championship three times, the first time in 2004-05, followed by 2006-07, and 2009-10.

After a couple of building seasons the Rocks climbed their to way to their first AA Senior final vs the Clinton Radars. It was hyped as a battle of the Titans, but the Rocks poured it on and swept the series 4-0. Coach Larry Magnus was especially complimentary of the ‘university line’ of Jay ‘rocket feet’ Henry, Scott Heasman and Brett Turner.

2006–07 Rocks season
The Rocks had another very strong season, finishing with a 16-5-3 record, which placed them in third place in the North Division, and qualifying for the Senior "AA" playoffs.

Elora faced the Lucan-Ilderton Jets in the quarter-finals in a close series that had three straight games go into overtime, with Elora winning two of them.  The Rocks would go on and defeat the Jets in six games and move on to the "AA" semi-finals.

In the semi-finals, the Rocks would face the Lucknow Lancers, and opened the series up on the right foot with a 6-5 double overtime victory.  Elora carried the momentum into the next game and easily defeated Lucknow, going up 2-0 in the series.  Game three in Lucknow would go into overtime once again, and Elora would again win, this time by a 5-4 score and take a 3-0 series lead.  The Rocks would then complete the sweep, with a close 3-2 game four win in Elora, and advance to the "AA" finals.

The Rocks would play the Tavistock Royals to determine the "AA" championship, and the teams would split the first four games, each winning two on the road.  Tavistock would take a 3-2 series lead as they won the fifth game 7-3, the first win by either team on home ice.  Elora would return home for game six, and won a hard-fought game by a score of 6-3, setting up a seventh game in Tavistock.  The Royals got on the scoreboard first with a goal 1:37 into the game; however, the Rocks responded with three goals in a row, and would end up winning the game 7-3, and winning the 2006-07 WOAA Sr. "AA" Championship.

2007–08 Rocks season
Elora would be the highest scoring team in the WOAA in 2007-08, scoring 197 goals, and the team would have its best regular season in team history, going 22-2-2, and earning 46 points.  They would finish with the same point total as the Saugeen Shores Winterhawks, but the Rocks had one fewer win than Saugeen Shores, and finished the season as the second place team in the North Division.

The defending "AA" champions would open the playoffs against the Lucan-Ilderton Jets, who they defeated in the quarter-finals the previous season.  Elora opened the series up with a 4-3 victory, then took a 2-0 series lead with a solid 6-2 win in Lucan.  The Rocks continued to dominate the series, shutting the Jets out 5-0 in the third game, and they would complete the sweep with a 6-4 victory in game four to advance to the "AA" semi-finals.

The Rocks would face the Saugeen Shores Winterhawks in the semi-finals, and Elora took a 1-0 series lead with a 6-5 OT victory.  Saugeen Shores would take the next two games to take the series lead, but the Rocks would even up the series in the fourth game with a solid 5-2 win.  Elora would hold off the Winterhawks for a 6-5 victory in the fifth game to take a 3-2 series lead.  The sixth game would be decided in OT, as the Rocks would score the series winning goal in the extra period to defeat Saugeen Shores 2-1, and win the series 4-2.

Elora would face the Tavistock Royals in the "AA" finals, which was a rematch from the previous season, in which Elora won the championship in seven games. The Rocks opened the series on a winning note, taking the series opener 5-2 in Tavistock. However, the Royals evened it up, winning the second game by a close 5-4 score in Elora. Tavistock took a 2-1 series lead with another 5-4 victory in game three, and the Royals would continue their winning ways with a close 4-3 victory in the fourth game.  The Rocks had no answers for Tavistock in the fifth game, as the Royals dominated Elora, winning the game 6-1, and winning the championship.

2008–09 Rocks season

After a slow start to the season, in which the Rocks dropped their first two games, Elora rebounded, and finished the year in second place in the WOAA North Division with a 16-4-0 record, earning 32 points.

The Rocks opened the post-season against the Lucknow Lancers, with the winner of the best of seven series advancing to the "AA" playoffs. Elora opened the series with a blowout victory, defeating the Lancers 6-1, but Lucknow fought back in the second game, defeating the Rocks 3-1, to even the series. Elora rebounded in the third game, defeating Lucknow 5-3 to retake the series lead, then the Rocks took control of the series, crushing the Lancers 7-1 in the fourth game to take a 3-1 series lead. Elora ended up winning the series in the fifth game, holding off Lucknow 5-3, to advance to the "AA" playoffs.

In the "AA" quarter-finals, the Rocks faced the Shelburne Muskies, and it was Shelburne that struck first, defeating Elora 6-3 in the series opener, followed by another 6-3 Muskies victory in the second game to put the Rocks down 2-0 in the series. Elora responded in the third game, defeating Shelburne 6-5 in OT to cut into the Muskies series lead.  In the fourth game, Shelburne was able to hold off Elora 7-5 to take a 3-1 series lead.  The Rocks fought off elimination in the fifth game, defeating the Muskies 7-4. However, in the sixth game, Shelburne finished off Elora with an overtime victory, defeating the Rocks 8-7 and eliminating Elora from the playoffs.

2009–10 Rocks season
After a disappointing playoff run in the 2008-09 season, the Rocks responded with a perfect 20-0-0 record during the regular season, finishing in first place in the WOAA North Division. Elora led the league with 153 goals, and the club had three games in which they won by ten goals.

In the "AA" qualifying round, the Rocks faced the Shallow Lake Crushers in a best of five series. In the series opener, Elora handled the Crushers easily, defeating Shallow Lake 7-1 to take an early series lead. The Rocks stayed dominant in the second game, as they earned a 7-2 victory, before completing the series sweep with a 4-1 win in the third game to advance to the "AA" playoffs.

The Rocks opponent in the "AA" quarter-finals was the Ripley Wolves. Elora took the first game of the series, a close 4-3 win over the Wolves. In the second game, the Wolves stunned the Rocks, ending their twenty-four game winning streak with a 7-6 overtime decision to even the series. Ripley surprised Elora in the third game, defeating the Rocks rather easily by a 6-3 score to take a 2-1 series lead. Elora responded in the fourth game, dominating the Wolves in an 11-0 shutout win to even the series at two games apiece.  The Rocks held off Ripley in the fifth game, winning 7-5, and then ended the series in the sixth game with another shutout victory, this time by a score of 6-0, to advance to the semi-finals.

Up next for the Rocks was the defending champions, the Saugeen Shores Winterhawks. Elora took the series opener with a 5-4 overtime victory, then took a 2-0 series lead with a 5-1 win in the second game. The third game would once again be decided in overtime, and it was Elora who came away with the victory by a score of 4-3. Saugeen Shores kept the fourth game close once again; however, the Rocks completed the sweep with a 4-3 win to advance to the "AA" finals.

In the final round, the Rocks would face the Petrolia Squires.  In the series opener, Elora continued its winning ways, defeating the Squires 5-4. Petrolia responded in the second game, beating the Rocks 5-1 to even the series up. Elora retook the series lead in the third game, defeating Petrolia 5-3, but the Squires would once again even the series up, shutting out the Rocks 5-0 in the fourth game. Elora came out strong in the fifth game, easily defeating Petrolia 7-3 to take the 3-2 series lead. In the sixth game, the Rocks and Squires play another very close game, and it was Elora who came out on top 4-3 to win the WOAA "AA" championship for the third time in six seasons.

2010–11 Rocks season
The Rocks had some controversy in regards to using an illegal player, as defenseman Brendon Haefling suited up for four games with the Rocks. He was listed as a local player from Fergus, Ontario; however, he actually lived in Waterloo, Ontario, and should have been signed to an import card. Elora won those four games, but the league punished the Rocks by counting those games as losses.  All the stats in these games remained untouched. The games included in this controversy was two victories over the Durham Thundercats by scores of 6-2 and 6-3, an 8-2 win over the Shallow Lake Crushers, and an 11-4 victory over the Walkerton Capitals.  It ended the Rocks regular season game winning streak at twenty-six games.  Despite this, the club finished the year with a 20-6-0 record, finishing second in the North Division, with 40 points.

Season-by-season record
Note: GP = Games played, W = Wins, L = Losses, T= Tie, OTL = Overtime Losses, Pts = Points, GF = Goals for, GA = Goals against

External links
WOAA website
WOAA Senior Hockey website
Elora Rocks website

Ice hockey teams in Ontario
Senior ice hockey teams
Centre Wellington